The Law of Bahrain is set out in its constitution.  Several controversial laws have been passed in the history of the country.  The State Security Law of 1974, for example, was used by the government to crush political unrest from 1974 until 2001.  Also, the Royal Decree 56 of 2002 issued by King Hamad ibn Isa Al Khalifah grants impunity to security officers and state officials from being prosecuted for human rights abuses prior to 2001.  Amiri decrees are also put into effect in the Law of Bahrain.

See also
 Judiciary of Bahrain